Gabby McGill (born 4 June 2000) is an English footballer who plays as a forward for Airdrieonians. McGill previously played youth football with York City and Middlesbrough, senior footballer with Dunfermline Athletic and had spells on loan with Edinburgh City and York City.

Club career
McGill, son of York City chairman Jason McGill, started his career with the Bootham Crescent club, playing for their youth squads over a three-year period. In July 2017, McGill was signed by EFL Championship side Middlesbrough on a two-year deal.

After spending two years with the Middlesbrough youth sides, McGill was signed by Scottish Championship club Dunfermline Athletic on 30 May 2019, after the two clubs agreed a development fee. In October 2020, McGill joined Scottish League Two club Edinburgh City until January 2021. McGill subsequently returned to York City for the remainder of the season on loan, and left Dunfermline at the end of his contract in May 2021.

McGill signed with Scottish League One club Airdrieonians in July 2021.

Career statistics

References

External links
 (Soccerbase incorrectly recorded two appearances for Dunfermline in April 2021 whilst McGill was on loan with York City)

2000 births
Living people
English footballers
Association football forwards
York City F.C. players
Middlesbrough F.C. players
Dunfermline Athletic F.C. players
F.C. Edinburgh players
Scottish Professional Football League players
Airdrieonians F.C. players